Hangar 13 is an American video game developer based in Novato, California, in the area of the former Hamilton Air Force Base. Established with Haden Blackman in December 2014 as a division of 2K (a publishing label of Take-Two Interactive), the company's debut game was Mafia III, released in October 2016. In 2017, 2K Czech was merged into Hangar 13, wherefore the studio received two additional studios in Brno and Prague; another studio was opened in Brighton in 2018. Their second title, Mafia: Definitive Edition, was released in September 2020.

History 
Hangar 13 was formed around September 2013, when 2K Games announced that Rod Fergusson would be running a new San Francisco studio. However, Fergusson left the position by January 2014, which he claimed was due to "creative differences" with management.

On December 4, 2014, 2K announced that it had set up a new game studio, Hangar 13, led by Haden Blackman, formerly creative director for LucasArts. Blackman told GamesBeat that the studio would work on a game for Microsoft Windows, PlayStation 4 and Xbox One. Mafia III, the studio's debut title, was announced in August 2015. 2K Czech, the developer of previous entries in the Mafia series, had a supporting role in the game's development. Mafia III was released on October 7, 2016, for Microsoft Windows, PlayStation 4 and Xbox One. In 2017, 2K Czech was merged into Hangar 13.

In February 2018, 2K announced that Hangar 13 had been hit with sizable layoffs, without disclosing exact numbers. At the time, Hangar 13 was brainstorming ideas for its next game—one idea included a "fight to music" system through which the player's movement would create songs, similar to Harmonix's cancelled game Chroma. In May 2018, Hangar 13 opened an additional studio in Brighton, UK, headed by Nick Baynes. In July 2018, the studio announced that it was working on a new intellectual property.

In March 2019, it was announced that the studio had collaborated with Gearbox Software to develop a free update for Borderlands: The Handsome Collection, which added 4K graphics to the remastered versions of Borderlands 2 and Borderlands: The Pre-Sequel.

In May 2020, 2K and Hangar 13 announced the Mafia Trilogy. This contained a remake of the first Mafia, a remaster of Mafia II (developed by d3t) and a platinum version of Mafia III comprised with its additional story packs. These editions were available as a bundle or individually. Both the original Mafia II and Mafia III owners on Steam and console had their editions upgraded at no cost.

In November 2021, it was confirmed that Volt, an unannounced game by Hangar 13, was cancelled by Take-Two Interactive after running up a loss of $53 million in production costs. In May 2022, Blackman announced his impending departure from the company. He is to be succeeded by Hangar 13 Brighton studio head Nick Baynes. Later that month, after Baynes had taken over, Hangar 13 laid off people across its four studios, of which the Novato headquarters dismissed 50 of its 87 employees. It was reported that Hangar 13 was in the early stages of development for a prequel to the Mafia trilogy as well as a new entry to the Top Spin series; Hangar 13 is also awaiting a greenlight from its parent company to begin development on a 5th entry to the Mafia series alongside its prequel, as Baynes describes, to keep its developers employed at the studio for a smooth transition from one game to another.

In August 2022, development on a new Mafia game was confirmed to have started.

Games developed

Notes

References

External links 
 

2014 establishments in California
2K (company)
American companies established in 2014
Companies based in Marin County, California
Novato, California
Software companies based in the San Francisco Bay Area
Take-Two Interactive divisions and subsidiaries
Video game companies established in 2014
Video game companies of the United States
Video game development companies